Moorsom may refer to:

Moorsom System for calculating tonnage of sailing ships
HMS Moorsom, two Royal Navy ships

People with the surname

Constantine Richard Moorsom (1792–1861), Royal Navy admiral, businessman and abolitionist
James Marshall Moorsom (1837–1918), British Liberal Party politician
Lewis Moorsom (1835–1914), English cricketer
Robert Moorsom (1760–1835), Royal Navy admiral
William Moorsom (1804–1863), English engineer

See also
Moorsom family tree: showing relationships between some of the above